Larry Pine (born March 3, 1945) is an American actor.

A veteran of the Broadway stage, he began his career playing the role of Fop in the 1968 production of Cyrano de Bergerac. He has since starred in film and television, with recurring roles in television shows such as As the World Turns, One Life to Live, All My Children, Hostages, House of Cards, and Succession. He has also appeared in films such as Vanya on 42nd Street (1994) for which he was nominated for the Independent Spirit Award for Best Supporting Male, Tim Robbins's Dead Man Walking (1995), Before and After (1996), Maid in Manhattan (2002), Woody Allen's Melinda and Melinda (2004), and Wes Anderson's The Royal Tenenbaums (2001), Moonrise Kingdom (2012), The Grand Budapest Hotel (2014), and The French Dispatch (2021).

Career
Pine began his professional acting career Off-Broadway, then in 1968 appeared as Fop in Cyrano de Bergerac at the Vivian Beaumont Theater. A founding member of the avant-garde theater company the Manhattan Project, he appeared in its 1968 production of Alice in Wonderland, directed by Andre Gregory.

In 1978, he made his film debut in James Ivory's Hullabaloo Over Georgie and Bonnie's Pictures, which was made for television but later released theatrically. Since then, he has performed in Louis Malle's Vanya on 42nd Street and Woody Allen's Celebrity, Small Time Crooks, and Melinda and Melinda, among other films. Pine appears in the book Are You Dave Gorman? as the first actor the writer encounters to have played a fictional Dave Gorman (in The Ice Storm). In both The Royal Tenenbaums and The Door in the Floor, he appears as a Charlie Rose-type interviewer, conducting a one-on-one interview in a dark studio. From 1997 to 1999, Pine portrayed Barry Shire on All My Children.

Personal life
Pine was born in Tucson, Arizona. He received a Bachelor of Arts degree from the University of North Texas, and went on to graduate from New York University's Tisch School of the Arts in 1968 with a Master of Fine Arts degree. Since 1969, he has been married to composer and sound designer Margaret Pine (née Rachlin). The couple have one son, Jacob (born 1972).

Filmography

Film

Television

Stage

Awards and nominations

References

Further reading
 Manhattan Project. Alice in Wonderland: The Forming of a Company and the Making of a Play, New York: Merlin House (1973).

External links
 
 
 

1945 births
20th-century American male actors
21st-century American male actors
American male film actors
American male stage actors
American male television actors
Living people
Male actors from Tucson, Arizona
Tisch School of the Arts alumni
University of North Texas alumni